Dennis Milton (born August 23, 1961) is an American former professional boxer.

Amateur career
Milton had a stellar amateur career, having won four New York Golden Gloves Championships. Milton won the 1981 165 lb Open Championship and won the 156 lb Open Championships in 1982, 1983 and 1984. In 1981 Milton defeated future World Champion Iran Barkley of the Knights Community Center in the finals to win the 165 lb Open Championship. Milton stopped (RSC-2) Anthony Dimasso of the Nassau Police Boys Club to win the 1982 156 lb Open Championship. In 1983 Milton defeated Mark Weinman of the Police Athletic Leagues 110th Precinct in the finals to win the 156 lb Open Championship, and captured silver at the 1983 Pan American Games.  Milton won his fourth New York Golden Gloves Championship in 1984 by defeating Jesse Lanton of the Rockland County Police Athletic League in the 156 lb Open finals.

Milton trained at the Police Athletic League's Webster Center in the Bronx, New York.

Professional career
Known as "The Magician", Milton turned pro in 1985 and had limited success.  His most notable victory came over future champion Gerald McClellan in 1989 in an eight round decision win.  The win triggered a streak which led to a bout against WBC Middleweight Title holder Julian Jackson in 1991.  The bout ended quickly, with Jackson scoring a 1st round KO.  In 1992 Milton lost to Bernard Hopkins via TKO, and left pro boxing for good after losing to Aaron Davis by TKO in 1995.

References

1961 births
Living people
Boxers from New York City
Boxers at the 1983 Pan American Games
Pan American Games silver medalists for the United States
Sportspeople from the Bronx
American male boxers
Pan American Games medalists in boxing
Middleweight boxers
Medalists at the 1983 Pan American Games